The Museum of Finnish Architecture is an architectural museum in Helsinki, Finland. Established in 1956, it is the second oldest museum of its kind (after the Shchusev Museum of Architecture in Moscow) devoted specifically to architecture. The museum was founded on the basis of the photographic collection of the Finnish Association of Architects (SAFA), which was established in 1949.

The museum is on Kasarmikatu street in Ullanlinna, housed in a neo-classical building, designed by architect Magnus Schjerfbeck and completed in 1899. The building was originally in the use of a scientific society and the University of Helsinki. The museum took over use of the building in 1981, before which it had been housed in a former wooden pavilion in Kaivopuisto Park. Occupying the same city block as the Museum of architecture is the Design Museum. In 1984 an architectural competition was arranged for a new building to be built in the gap between the two buildings, this linking them together as a single institution.  The competition was won by architects Helin and Siitonen, but the project was abandoned soon afterwards, due to logistics and problems of finance. The building is currently owned by the State of Finland through Senate Properties.

The museum has large collections of drawings, photographs and architectural scale models. It also has its own library and bookstore. The museum organises exhibitions on both Finnish and foreign architecture as well as exhibitions on Finnish architecture for touring abroad. It also publishes its own books.

Although independent of SAFA and its journal The Finnish Architectural Review (ARK), the museum is seen, along with these, as the key influence in continuously promoting modern architecture in Finland. This policy has been promoted vigorously abroad and sponsored by the Finnish Ministry of Foreign Affairs and Ministry of education.

See also 
 Architecture of Finland

References 
 Petra Ceferin, Constructing a Legend. The International Exhibitions of Finnish Architecture 1957–1967. Helsinki, SKS, 2005.
 Roger Connah, The Piglet Years.  The Lost Militancy in Finnish Architecture. Tampere, Datutop, 2006.
 Pekka Korvenmaa (ed.), The Work of Architects: The Finnish Association of Architects 1892–1992. Helsinki, The Finnish Association of Architects, 1992.

External links 

 

Museums in Helsinki
Art museums and galleries in Finland
Architecture museums
Architecture in Finland
Modernist architecture in Finland
Neoclassical architecture in Finland
Art museums established in 1956
1956 establishments in Finland
Kaartinkaupunki